Niurgun Skriabin is a Belarusian freestyle wrestler. He won the silver medal in the 65 kg event at the 2020 European Wrestling Championships held in Rome, Italy. He competed at the World Wrestling Championships in 2018 and in 2019.

In March 2021, he competed at the European Qualification Tournament in Budapest, Hungary hoping to qualify for the 2020 Summer Olympics in Tokyo, Japan. He lost his first match against Vazgen Tevanyan of Armenia and then failed to reach the bronze medal match in the repechage.

Major results

References

External links 
 

Living people
Place of birth missing (living people)
Belarusian male sport wrestlers
European Wrestling Championships medalists
1990 births
20th-century Belarusian people
21st-century Belarusian people